Lone Cedar is an unincorporated community in Jackson County, West Virginia, United States.

The community was named for an individual cedar tree near the original town site.

References 

Unincorporated communities in West Virginia
Unincorporated communities in Jackson County, West Virginia